Schleicher is a German surname. Notable people with the surname include:

 Alexander Schleicher (1901–1968), German sailplane designer
 August Schleicher (1821–1868), German linguist
 Bernard Schleicher, Austrian-born British businessman
 Carl Schleicher (1825–1903), Austrian painter
 Filip Schleicher (1870-1932), Polish-Jewish lawyer, deputy mayor of Lviv
 Gustav Schleicher (1823–1879), German-American engineer and US congressman
 Kurt von Schleicher (1882–1934), German general and chancellor
 Nikita Shleikher, Russian diver
 Ruby Schleicher (born 1998), Australian rules footballer
 Rüdiger Schleicher (1895–1945), German resistance fighter against the Nazi régime
 Thomas Schleicher (1972–2001), Austrian judoka
 Ursula Schleicher (born 1933), German politician and harpist

German-language surnames